A reign is the period of time a monarch rules.

Reign may also refer to:

Popular culture
 Reign (TV series), a 2013 American television series
 Reign: The Conqueror, a Japanese anime
 Spider-Man: Reign, a Spider-Man comic book limited series
 "Reign", a 2003 song by Unkle from Never, Never, Land
 "Reign", a 2016 song by Chris Quilala from Split the Sky
 Reign, a DC Comics supervillain and enemy of Supergirl
 The Reign (album), a 2017 album by Hinder
 Reign (album), a 2018 album by Shatta Wale
 "Reign" (Supergirl episode), an episode of Supergirl
 Reign (Arrowverse), a character from the Arrowverse
 Reign: Conflict of Nations, a 2009 strategy game developed by Lesta Studio
 Reigns (video game), a 2016 strategy game developed by Nerial

People
 Eva Reign, American actress and journalist

Sports
 Ontario Reign, an ECHL team in Ontario, California 
 Portland Reign, an American Basketball Association team in Portland, Oregon
 Seattle Reign FC, a current Seattle-based soccer team in the National Women's Soccer League
 Seattle Reign (basketball), a former women's basketball team in the 1996–1998 American Basketball League
 Atlanta Reign, an American esports team in the Overwatch League

See also
 
 Rain (disambiguation)
 Raine (disambiguation)
 Rane (disambiguation)
 Rein (disambiguation)
 Rayne (disambiguation)
 Roman Reigns (born 1985), American professional wrestler and former football player